Macau is a city of tourism with a multicultural blend which provides a broad sense and international perspective for its college students. The free academic atmosphere and its profound and unique foundation in culture have also created favorable conditions for higher education. Most of the curricula, teachers and the general quality of teaching have reached an internationally accepted level.

Mainly English or Chinese (or both) are the languages of instruction in universities, some courses or programs are conducted in Portuguese.

The following is a list of universities, polytechnics and other advanced level (higher) education and research institutions in Macau.

See also
Education in Macau
List of colleges and universities by country
List of colleges and universities

References

 
Universities
Macau
Macau
Macau
Universities